Joseph Maria von Radowitz may refer to:

*Joseph von Radowitz, Joseph Maria Ernst Christian Wilhelm von Radowitz  (1797–1853), Prussian general and statesman
Joseph Maria von Radowitz, Jr. (1839–1912), German diplomat
Joseph von Radowitz (general), Joseph Maria Hermann Ernst Peter Hans von Radowitz (1899–1956), German Wehrmacht and Bundeswehr general